Galimatias (born Matias Saabye Køedt) is an electronic music artist from the small town of Fredericia in rural Denmark. He currently resides in Los Angeles, CA. Galimatias is most known for his 2015 EP Urban Flora with American singer-songwriter Alina Baraz.

Career
Galimatias began making music as a teenager, and produced tracks for Danish hip-hop acts around the turn of the 2010s.
In 2012, he released two EPs of mellow, downtempo instrumentals: Luna Soul and Sunlight Reigns Supreme.

He began working with Alina Baraz after they were introduced to each other through SoundCloud in 2013, and their songs immediately received blog attention. Their collaborations were collected on an eight-song EP titled Urban Flora, which was released digitally by Ultra Records in 2015, with a vinyl release by Mom + Pop following in 2016. Felix Jaehn's remix of their song "Fantasy" appeared on many dance compilations.
Following its release, praise for the EP began to pour in from publications such as FADER, NPR, Earmilk, Dancing Astronaut, and Huffington Post.

On 15 June 2017, Galimatias released the single "Let Me Know". The song consists of different layers of beatboxing through vocoders, mixed into a harmony that also serves as a rhythm throughout the track.

In an interview with Complex, Galimatias stated "I haven't released anything for two years but that didn't mean I stopped making music. I tuned out from social media for a year as well and people started sending me messages asking if I was still alive. I'm definitely not dead, but I don't ever want to create the same sound twice, and it took a good while for me to figure out what I wanted to do after Urban Flora. I have a lot of criteria for myself when I make music, and creating something that hasn't been heard before is definitely one of the highest ranking ones."

Discography

Albums
 Luna Soul (2012)
 Young Chimera (2013)
 Sunlight Reigns Supreme (2013)
 Urban Flora (2015)
 Urban Flora (Remixes) (2015)
 Renaissance Boy (2020)

Singles
 "To the Moon & Beyond" (2012)
 "Noelles Eloquence" (2012)
 "Crestfallen (2012)
 "Leaving for Good" (2012)
 "Purple Rain" (2012)
 "Succubus" (2012)
 "Ocean Floor Kisses" (2014)
 "Voice of Reason" (2014)
 "Night Owl" (2014)
 "Drift" (2015)
 "Pretty Thoughts" (2015)
 "Fantasy" (2015)
 "Make You Feel" (2015)
 "Blowback" (2017)
 "Won't Forget" (2017)
 "Let Me Know" (2017)
 "South" (2018)
 "Redeye" (2020)
 "Let Go" (2020)
 "Laying Low" (2020)
 "Shy Dancer" (2020)

Remixes
 "Strawberries (Madeaux Remix)" by Madeaux (2013)
 "Fantasy (Felix Jaehn Remix)" by Felix Jaehn (2015)
 "Fantasy (Vices Remix)" by Vices (2015)
 "Fantasy (Pomo Remix)" by Pomo (2015)
 "Can I (Tez Cadey Remix)" by Tez Cadey (2015)
 "Can I (GEOTHEORY Remix)" by GEOTHEORY (2015)
 "Make You Feel (Hotel Garuda Remix)" by Hotel Garuda (2015)
 "Make You Feel (Kerala Remix)" by Kerala (2015)
 "Make You Feel (Ark Patrol Remix)" by Ark Patrol (2015)
 "Pretty Thoughts (FKJ Remix)" by FKJ (2015)

References

Date of birth missing (living people)
Living people
Danish musicians
21st-century Danish musicians
People from Los Angeles
Year of birth missing (living people)